Elena Pogorelova (born 16 September 1969) is a Russian former professional tennis player.

Pogorelova played on the professional tour in the early 1990s, with a best singles ranking of 508 in the world. As a doubles player she won two ITF titles and made a WTA Tour main draw appearance at the Moscow Ladies Open in 1990, partnering Irina Zvereva.

In 1992, following the breakup of the Soviet Union, she featured in a Federation Cup tie for the Commonwealth of Independent States team (CIS). She played a dead rubber doubles match in CIS's World Group second round loss to France, where she and Elena Makarova were beaten by Isabelle Demongeot and Nathalie Tauziat.

ITF finals

Doubles: 4 (2–2)

References

External links
 
 
 

1969 births
Living people
Soviet female tennis players
Russian female tennis players